Masao Azuma (born March 24, 1971 in Kōchi, Japan) is a Japanese former Grand Prix motorcycle road racer who competed in the 125cc class from 1996 to 2003. During his eight years in the 125 class he rode exclusively for Honda and used Bridgestone tyres for six of those years. He finished in the Top 5 of the Championship for four consecutive years.

Early career 
Azuma began racing minibikes at an early age in the Japanese national championships. He was the Japanese National 125cc Champion in 1993 and 1994. He made his 125cc World Championship debut as a wildcard at Suzuka in 1996 and finished an impressive 6th.

1997 
Azuma competed in the full 1997  season for the LB Racing Team and showed good consistency regularly finishing just outside the top 10. He scored a best finish of 4th, again at his home round at Suzuka. He finished the season in 15th place in the Championship.

1998 
Azuma joined the Leigeois Competition team and aside from four DNFs never finished outside the top 10. Five podium finishes, including a win in Australia saw him finishing 4th overall in the Championship and marked him out as one of the top Japanese riders and a title contender for the following year.

1999 
With the same team in 1999 (now renamed the Liegeois Playlife Racing Team) Azuma began a serious title bid, winning five of the first eight races, securing two pole positions (the only poles of his career) and leading the 125cc Championship. Disaster awaited at Rd 10 in Brno however. During qualifying a small deer ran onto the track right into the path of Azuma's accelerating motorcycle. In the ensuing crash, Azuma was not seriously injured and raced the next day eventually finishing 12th. However, it was to be a turning point in the year, and perhaps his career. The remaining six rounds saw erratic and relatively poor results from Azuma, while his title rivals Marco Melandri and Emilio Alzamora gained on him in the Championship. Melandri scored 5 race wins in the latter half of the season, and Champion-to-be Alzamora's consistent podium finishes would eventually relegate Azuma to 3rd in the Championship. This was to be his highest Championship finish.

2000 
Now under the Benetton Playlife banner, Azuma's 2000 season was an erratic one with four DNFs countered by six podiums. He put together a good string of results towards the end of the season with a fifth, two second places and a win at the final round in Australia, but the inconsistency up to then meant he couldn't challenge for the title. He finished the championship in fourth.

2001 
The 2001 season started out promising with Azuma winning two of the first three races. By winning the first race of the new season and the last race of the previous season Azuma was to set a 125 class record that would not be repeated again until 2007 when Hector Faubel won the last race of 2006 and the first race of 2007. However, an inconsistent season was to follow and Azuma never managed to make it onto the podium during the rest of the season. He finished 5th in the Championship, almost 100 points behind the eventual Champion Manuel Poggiali.

2002 
Now in the Trial by Breil team, Azuma's 2002 season got off to a slow start, his only podium appearance being a win at the Brazilian Grand Prix near the end of the season. This was to be his final win at World Championship level. He finished the season 8th in the Championship.

2003 
Moving to the Ajo Motorsports team, Azuma struggled to make headway, with only 4 Top 10 finishes all season and 7 DNFs. He announced his retirement at his home race, the Pacific GP at Motegi, with 3 rounds still to go. At the GP in Australia, he recorded his best result all year with a 2nd place. He retired from racing at the end of the season, finishing in 16th place in the Championship.

Post-racing career 
While his riding career was over, Masao Azuma continued to work in the MotoGP paddock. 
In 2007, he worked with Bridgestone tyres as their MotoGP Field Engineer for the Rizla Suzuki MotoGP team, and in 2008 he switched to the works Ducati MotoGP team in the same role.

References 
 Official MotoGP Site
Results for the 125cc class, 1996 to 2003
Interview with Masao Azuma in April 2007

Japanese motorcycle racers
125cc World Championship riders
1971 births
Living people
Sportspeople from Kōchi Prefecture